High-Logic, founded in 1997 by Erwin Denissen, is a privately held company headquartered in De Bilt, the Netherlands. High-Logic produces font editing and font management software.

Products

FontCreator 
The company's flagship product is FontCreator (formerly known as Font Creator Program) for Microsoft Windows. Fonts are created using multiple vector drawing aids from free-hand drawing of individual glyphs to importing vector (PDF, EPS, SVG) or bitmap graphics.

Highlights of Recent Versions 

 FontCreator 11 introduced support for CFF Postscript outlines
 FontCreator 12 introduced Anchor-based Composites
 FontCreator 13 supports SVG colour fonts, and import for Unified Font Object (UFO).
 FontCreator 14 supports Variable fonts, import/export of Designspace documents with UFOs. It now has three themes and uses docking/floating palettes instead of dialogs.

The latest version, FontCreator 14, was released in June 2021, which was last updated in August 2021.

MainType 
On December 2, 2005 High-Logic released MainType, a font-management program for Windows, which has also been constantly updated and improved. Tools are provided for installing, uninstalling, loading (temporarily installing a font until your computer is turned off) and unloading fonts to the Windows Font Folder. In addition to providing a visual representation of each glyph and detailed information about each font AND rapid access to huge font collections, they can be easily arranged into user designed groups for seasonal or whatever categories a user can imagine. Even registry repair is included in the package.

A free version is available for non-commercial use, with fewer features, and the font library limited to 2,500 fonts.

The latest version, MainType 11, was released in May 2021, and was last updated a few days later.

Scanahand 
On April 23, 2008 High-Logic released Scanahand, a font generator for Windows allows the user to print out a form, manually fill in the glyphs, scan it into the program and generate new fonts. The most recent version, Scanahand 7.0, was released in January 2020, which was last updated in July 2020.

References

External links
 High-Logic Web Site
 FontCreator Review

Companies established in 1997
Digital typography
Vector graphics editors
Dutch brands